Dorothy Muriel Wheeler (1891–1966) was an English Illustrator. She studied at the Blackheath School of Art, where her principal media were watercolour and ink.  She designed children's book illustrations, postcards and comic strips.

A series of her works were used by Bamforth & Co Ltd, a publisher of fine postcards, for their Woodland Secrets and Fairy Series collections of cards, published around 1920. Her illustrations appeared in Enid Blyton's widely published children's books.  They also appeared in books by Anne MacDonald.  She published her own version of the Three Little Pigs in 1955.  Her final work appeared in 1965, illustrations for Enid Blyton's The Ring O'Bells Mystery.

Books Illustrated by Dorothy M. Wheeler 

books written by Enid Blyton:

 The Enchanted Wood, first published in 1939 by Enid Blyton
 The Little Tree-House, first published in 1939 by George Newnes
 The Further Adventures of Josie, Click and Bun, first published in 1941 by George Newnes
 The Adventures of Mr. Pink-Whistle, first published in 1941 by George Newnes
 Five o'Clock Tales, first published in 1942 by Methuen
 Six o'Clock Tales, first published in 1942 by Methuen
 The Magic Faraway Tree, first published in 1943 by Enid Blyton
 Seven o'Clock Tales, first published in 1943 by Methuen
 Dame Slap and Her School, first published in 1943 by George Newnes
 Eight o'Clock Tales, first published in 1944 by Methuen
 The Folk of the Faraway Tree, first published in 1946 by George Newnes
 Josie, Click and Bun Again, first published in 1946 by George Newnes
 More About Josie, Click and Bun, first published in 1948 by George Newnes
 Bumpy and His Bus, first published in 1949 by George Newnes
 Mr. Tumpy and His Caravan, first published in 1949 by Sidgwick & Jackson
 Mr. Pink-Whistle Interferes, first published in 1950 by George Newnes
 Sunny Stories Calendar 1951, first published in 1950 by George Newnes
 Up the Faraway Tree, first published in 1951 by George Newnes
 Welcome, Josie, Click and Bun!, first published in 1952 by George Newnes
 Mandy, Mops and Cubby Find A House, first published in 1952 by Sampson Low
 Mr. Tumpy Plays a Trick on Saucepan, first Published in 1952 by Sampson Low
 Mandy, Mops and Cubby Again, first published in 1953 by Sampson Low
 Mandy Makes Cubby A Hat, first published in 1953 by Sampson Low
 Mr. Tumpy in the Land of Wishes, first published in 1953 by Sampson Low
 Mr. Tumpy in the Land of Boys and Girls, first published in 1953 by Sampson Low
 Mandy, Mops and Cubby and the Whitewash, First Published in 1955 by Sampson Low
 Mr. Pink-Whistle's Party, first published in 1955 by George Newnes
 Mr. Pink-Whistle's Big Book, first published in 1958 by Evans Brothers
 The Ring O'Bells Mystery, first published in 1965

other books

 English Nursery Rhymes by Lavinia Edna Walter, first published in 1916
 Through the Green Door by Anne MacDonald, first published in 1924
 A Pocketful of Silver by Anne Macdonald, first published in 1927
 Sung By The Sea by Anne MacDonald, first published in 1929
 The Three Little Pigs by Dorothy M. Wheeler, first published in 1951

References

External links 

 klingarts.com
 heathersblytonpages.com

British illustrators
1891 births
1966 deaths
Enid Blyton illustrators